Bobby Vinton is an American rock singer.

Bobby Vinton may also refer to:

 Bobby Vinton (1978 album), his 13th compilation album
 Bobby Vinton (1988 album), his 35th studio album
 Bobby Vinton (2001 album), his 35th compilation album

See also